Chestnut Street is a major historic street in Philadelphia, Pennsylvania. It was originally named Wynne Street because Thomas Wynne's home was there. William Penn renamed it Chestnut Street in 1684. It runs east–west from the Delaware River waterfront in downtown Philadelphia through Center City and West Philadelphia. The road crosses the Schuylkill River on the Chestnut Street Bridge. It serves as eastbound Pennsylvania Route 3 between 63rd and 33rd Streets.

Stratton's Tavern was located on Chestnut Street near Sixth Street. When the citizens of Philadelphia were afraid that the British might attack the essentially unmanned Fort Mifflin, the secretary of the Young Men's Democratic Society called a meeting held at Stratton's Tavern at Chestnut and Sixth Streets on March 20, 1813. The young men agreed to volunteer their services to defend the fort.

Points of interest

From east to west:
United States Custom House
National Liberty Museum
Carpenters' Hall
First National Bank (today, part of the Science History Institute)
Old City Hall
Second Bank of the United States
Independence Hall
Liberty Bell
Ben Franklin House, formerly the Benjamin Franklin Hotel
Belgravia Hotel
Historic Main Post Office (now the IRS 30th Street Campus)
Drexel University
University of Pennsylvania

Major intersections
The entire street is in Philadelphia, Philadelphia County.

See also
 History of Philadelphia

References

Streets in Philadelphia
Economy of Philadelphia

External links